Kharba Assembly constituency was an assembly constituency in Malda district in the Indian state of West Bengal.

Overview
As a consequence of the orders of the Delimitation Commission, Kharba Assembly constituency and Araidanga Assembly constituency cease to exist from 2011. There are two new constituencies in the area – Chanchal Assembly constituency and Malatipur Assembly constituency.

Kharba Assembly constituency was part of Raiganj (Lok Sabha constituency)

Members of Legislative Assembly

For MLAs from the area in subsequent years see Chanchal Assembly constituency and Malatipur Assembly constituency

Election results

1977–2006
In a by-election in 2008 necessitated by the death of the sitting MLA, Mahabubul Haque, Asif Mehboob of the Congress won the Kharba seat. In the 2006, 2001 and 1996 state assembly elections Mahabubul Haque of Congress won the 41 Kharba assembly seat defeating his nearest rivals Anjuman Ara Begum of CPI(M) in 2006 and Nazmul Hoque of CPI(M) in 2001 and 1996. Contests in most years were multi cornered but only winners and runners are being mentioned. Nazmul Hoque of CPI(M) defeated Mahabubul Haque of Congress in 1991 and 1987. Mahabubul Haque of Congress defeated Nazmul Hoque of CPI(M) in 1982. Golam Yazdani, Independent, defeated Mahabubul Haque of Congress in 1977.

1951–1972
Mahabubul Haque of Congress won in 1972. Golam Yazdani of CPI(M) won 1971. Golam Yazdani, Independent, won in 1969, 1967, 1962 and 1957. In independent India’s first election in 1951, Tafazzal Hossain of Congress won the Kharba seat.

References

Former assembly constituencies of West Bengal
Politics of Malda district